Gavin Charles Baker (born 3 October 1988, Edgware, Middlesex) is an English professional cricket player currently playing for Northamptonshire County Cricket Club after playing for his University, Loughborough MCCU. He is predominantly a right arm medium fast bowler who can also bat.

Career
Baker signed a professional deal with Northamptonshire at the end of the 2010 season, after impressing the coaching staff with solid performances in the 2nd XI. He made his first team debut in an LV= County Championship match against Derbyshire in August last season. The right arm seamer was picked up after playing against Northants for Loughborough University.

References

External links

1988 births
Living people
English cricketers
Northamptonshire cricketers
Loughborough MCCU cricketers
Hertfordshire cricketers
People from Edgware
English cricketers of the 21st century